The 1953–54 season was Real Madrid Club de Fútbol's 51st season in existence and the club's 23rd consecutive season in the top flight of Spanish football.

Summary
The club won its third league title over defending champion FC Barcelona after 21 years aimed by several arrivals such as Di Stefano from Millonarios Fútbol Club (included a transfer battle with CF Barcelona) and 20-yrs-old winger from Racing Santander Francisco Gento. On 1 August 1953 Spanish Federation banned the foreign players transfers to La Liga clubs and not lifting the measure until 1956 with the exception of oriundo players, meaning athletes who were born abroad but had Spanish ancestors as Alfredo Di Stéfano had. Also, newcomer striker Alfredo Di Stéfano got the Pichichi trophy of league topscorer with 27 goals. In June, the squad reached 1954 Copa del Generalísimo semi-finals being defeated by FC Barcelona. Real played without Di Stéfano, as the Copa del Generalísimo only allowed Spanish players to enter at the time.

Squad

Transfers

Competitions

La Liga

League table

Results by round

Matches

Copa del Generalísimo

Eightfinals

Quarter-finals

Semi-finals

Statistics

Squad statistics

Players statistics

References

Real Madrid CF seasons
Real Madrid CF
Spanish football championship-winning seasons